Anaklia Stadium is a multi-use stadium in Anaklia, Samegrelo-Zemo Svaneti region, Georgia.  It is used mainly for football matches and can seat 1,000 people.

See also 
Stadiums in Georgia

References 

Sports venues in Georgia (country)
Football venues in Georgia (country)
Buildings and structures in Samegrelo-Zemo Svaneti